Theodore Roosevelt National Park is an American national park of the badlands in western North Dakota comprising three geographically separated areas. Honoring U.S. President Theodore Roosevelt, it is the only American national park named directly after a single person.

The Little Missouri River flows through all three units of the park. The Maah Daah Hey Trail connects all three units. The park's larger South Unit lies alongside Interstate 94 near Medora, North Dakota. The smaller North Unit is situated about 80 mi (130 km) north of the South Unit, and Roosevelt's Elkhorn Ranch is located between the North and South units.

The park received 850,000 recreational visitors in 2021.

History

Roosevelt connection

Roosevelt first came to the North Dakota badlands to hunt bison in September 1883. During that first short trip, he got his bison and fell in love with the rugged lifestyle and the "perfect freedom" of the West.  He invested $14,000 in the Maltese Cross Ranch, which was already being managed by Sylvane Ferris and Bill Merrifield, seven miles south of Medora.  That winter, Ferris and Merrifield built the Maltese Cross Cabin.  After the death of both his wife and his mother on February 14, 1884, Roosevelt returned to his North Dakota ranch seeking solitude and time to heal.  That summer, he started his second ranch, the Elkhorn Ranch, 35 miles north of Medora, which he hired two Maine woodsmen, Bill Sewall and Wilmot Dow, to operate. Roosevelt took great interest in his ranches and in hunting in the West, detailing his experiences in pieces published in eastern newspapers and magazines. He wrote three major works on his life in the West: Ranch Life and the Hunting Trail, Hunting Trips of a Ranchman and The Wilderness Hunter.  His adventures in "the strenuous life" outdoors and the loss of his cattle in the starvation winter in 1886–1887 were influential in his pursuit of conservation policies as President of the United States (1901–1909).

Park development
Following Roosevelt's death in 1919, the Little Missouri Badlands were explored to determine possible park sites. Civilian Conservation Corps camps were established in both of the future park units from 1934 to 1941, and they developed roads and other structures in use today. The area was designated the Roosevelt Recreation Demonstration Area in 1935. In 1946 it was transferred to the United States Fish and Wildlife Service as the Theodore Roosevelt National Wildlife Refuge. After a five-year campaign by North Dakota representative William Lemke, President Truman established the South Unit of Theodore Roosevelt National Memorial Park on April 25, 1947, the only National Memorial Park ever established; the North Unit was added by act of Congress in June 1948.  In 1978, in addition to boundary adjustments and the establishment of 29,920 acres (121.1 km2) of the Theodore Roosevelt Wilderness, the park's designation was changed to Theodore Roosevelt National Park.

Geography

The park's larger South Unit lies alongside Interstate 94 near Medora, North Dakota. The smaller North Unit is situated about 80 mi (130 km) north of the South Unit, on U.S. Route 85, just south of Watford City, North Dakota. Roosevelt's Elkhorn Ranch is located between the North and South units, approximately 20 mi (32 km) west of US 85 and Fairfield, North Dakota.

Climate

According to the Köppen climate classification system, Theodore Roosevelt National Park has a Cold semi-arid climate (BSk). According to the United States Department of Agriculture, the Plant Hardiness zone at the North Unit Visitor Center (2008 ft / 612 m) is 3b with an average annual extreme minimum temperature of -30.6 °F (-34.8 °C), and 4a with an average annual extreme minimum temperature of -29.3 °F (-34.1 °C) at the South Unit Visitor Center (2261 ft / 689 m).

Ecology

According to the A. W. Kuchler U.S. Potential natural vegetation Types, Theodore Roosevelt National Park has two classifications; a Wheatgrass/Needlegrass (66) vegetation type with a North Mixed grass prairie (18) vegetation form, and a Northern Floodplain (98) vegetation type with a Floodplain Forests (24) vegetation form.

The park is home to a wide variety of Great Plains wildlife, including bison, coyotes, cougars, mustang horses, badgers, elk, bighorn sheep, white-tailed deer, mule deer, pronghorn, prairie dogs, and at least 186 species of birds including golden eagles, sharp-tailed grouse, and wild turkeys.

The bison, elk, and bighorn sheep were reintroduced to the park. Park officials manage populations of bison, horses, and elk to maintain a balanced ecosystem. Twenty-nine bison were introduced to a South Unit in 1956 and subsequently transferred 20 bison from that herd to the park's North Unit in 1962. They are routinely culled down to approximately 350 and 20 animals, respectively. The conservation of bison is an ongoing, diverse effort to bring bison back from the brink of extinction. The 2020 Bison Conservation Initiative by the Department of the Interior has five central goals: wild, healthy bison herds; genetic conservation; shared stewardship; ecological restoration; and cultural restoration.  Six yearling female bison were transferred in 2020 from Rocky Mountain Arsenal National Wildlife Refuge. National Park Service experts will study the extent to which translocated animals integrate into the established herds. 

The entire park has been surrounded with a  woven wire fence to keep bison and feral horses inside the park and commercial livestock out. Other animals are able to pass over, under, or through the fence in specific locations provided for that purpose. Biologists monitor prairie dog towns, though the park only controls their population in instances where they pose a threat to buildings or human health.

Attractions

There are three developed campgrounds: Juniper Campground in the North Unit, Cottonwood Campground in the South Unit, and the Roundup Group Horse Campground in the South Unit. Wildlife viewing is popular

The brown, dormant grass dominates from late summer through the winter, but explodes into green color in the early summer along with hundreds of species of flowering plants. During winter, snow covers the sharp terrain of the badlands and locks the park into what Theodore Roosevelt called "an abode of iron desolation."

A museum at the South Unit Visitor Center provides background on Roosevelt and his ranching days.  Roosevelt's Maltese Cross Cabin is at the South Unit Visitor Center.

The foundation of the ranch house and other shops buildings have been preserved, though the other portions of the cabin were removed and re-purposed after Roosevelt vacated the ranch. Threats to the Elkhorn Ranch site include oil development on adjacent lands, particularly visual intrusions and noise pollution from oil facilities and traffic.

The park units are mostly surrounded by Forest Service grasslands. The area has very dark night skies with excellent star gazing and occasional northern lights.

The town of Medora, at the entrance to the south unit, provides a western experience, with wooden planked sidewalks, old fashioned ice cream parlors, and buggy rides. There are several museums and the Burning Hills Amphitheather with nightly productions of the Medora Musical from early June to early September.

Wilderness 
Created by an act of Congress in 1978, the wilderness covers an area of 29,920 acres (121 km2) and comprises over a third of the area of Theodore Roosevelt National Park. There are two geographically separated sections of wilderness, one in each of the units of the National Park. The northern section covers most of the North Unit of the park, in McKenzie County, whereas the somewhat smaller southern section covers only the western portion of the larger South Unit, in Billings County.

The wilderness protects from development the wildest sections of the National Park, an area described as badlands where erosional forces have carved steep cliffs into the relatively flat prairie. Bison, pronghorn, elk, mule deer and coyote are all found here, along with hundreds of species of birds such as the bald eagle, falcon and hawk. The Little Missouri River is on the south side of both units and is credited for being the primary erosional source which created the badlands topography.

 of trails allow access to the most remote sections of the wilderness. Camping is allowed with a permit, however gathering wood for fires is prohibited and overnighters are encouraged to bring a portable stove.

U.S. Wilderness Areas do not allow motorized or mechanized vehicles, including bicycles. Although camping and fishing are usually allowed with a proper permit, no roads or buildings are constructed and there is also no logging or mining, in compliance with the 1964 Wilderness Act. Wilderness areas within National Forests and Bureau of Land Management areas also allow hunting in season.

See also
List of national parks of the United States
Presidential memorials in the United States

Notes

External links 

 of the National Park Service

"Writings of Theodore Roosevelt", broadcast from Theodore Roosevelt National Park from C-SPAN's American Writers

 
Badlands of the United States
Protected areas of Billings County, North Dakota
Protected areas of McKenzie County, North Dakota
Civilian Conservation Corps camps
Civilian Conservation Corps in North Dakota
Protected areas established in 1978
1978 establishments in North Dakota
Paleontology in North Dakota